Alfred Bird (1811 – 15 December 1878) was an English food manufacturer and chemist. He was born in Nympsfield, Gloucestershire, England in 1811 and was later a pupil at King Edward's School, Birmingham.  He was the inventor of a series of food products, most notably egg-free custard and baking powder. His father was a lecturer in astronomy at Eton College. His son Alfred Frederick Bird continued to develop the business after his father's death.

Career 
Alfred Bird registered as a pharmacist in Birmingham in 1842, having served an apprenticeship to Phillip Harris of that city. He was a qualified chemist and druggist and went on to open an experimental chemist's shop in Bull Street.

Alfred Bird's first major invention was egg-free custard in 1837. Alfred Bird used cornflour instead of egg to create an imitation of egg custard. It was originally intended only for his wife Elizabeth who had both egg and yeast allergies. The Birds used genuine custard when entertaining guests, but on one occasion the egg-free custard was (either by accident or design) fed to dinner guests. It was well received, and Alfred Bird realised that his invention had a wider use. Soon afterwards Alfred Bird founded 'Alfred Bird and Sons Ltd', which would go on to become the famous Bird's Custard company and brand.

Bird was not content to revolutionise custard but went on to invent a baking powder in 1843 so he could make yeast-free bread for his wife. This formula for baking powder is essentially the same as used in modern baking powders.

Death 

Alfred Bird died on 15 December 1878 in Kings Norton, Birmingham and is buried at Key Hill Cemetery in Birmingham. Famously his obituary in the journal of the Chemical Society (of which he was a fellow) discussed at length his skills and research but did not mention his other activity – the by then famous Bird's Custard and Bird's Jelly. It read:

Personal life 
His son, Alfred Frederick Bird, continued the work of his father. Bird junior went on to invent egg substitute powder in 1890, blancmange powder and jelly powder.

"The Custard Factory" in Digbeth, Birmingham, is now a centre providing space to artists.

See also 
 Henry Jones, a Bristol baker who patented self-raising flour in 1845, as a means of providing fresh bread on ships.
 August Oetker, German populariser of baking powder in 1891

References

External links
Alfred Bird

1811 births
1878 deaths
English inventors
19th-century British chemists
People from Birmingham, West Midlands
People educated at King Edward's School, Birmingham
Burials at Key Hill Cemetery